"I Can't See Nobody" is a song by the Bee Gees, released first as the B-side of "New York Mining Disaster 1941". With "New York Mining Disaster 1941", this song was issued as a double A in Germany and Japan, and included on the group's third LP, Bee Gees' 1st. "I Can't See Nobody" charted for one week at number 128 on the Billboard Bubbling Under the Hot 100 in July 1967.

Writing and recording
It was written by Barry and Robin Gibb in 1966 towards the end of the family's time living in Australia. Maurice Gibb has sometimes been listed as a co-writer for the song, most notably on the compilation Bee Gees Gold. According to Nat Kipner, the song was recorded at St. Clair Studios. Robin has said that it was written in Brisbane, Australia, where the band toured in November 1966, but that the first version was not released.

At the Bee Gees' 1st sessions, this song was recorded on 7 March, with remixing and overdubbing on 13 March. Robin sang lead on the verses while all three brothers featured on the chorus. Robin's voice on this track was higher than the other songs on the album, especially on the line Don't ask me why.

Personnel
Robin Gibb – lead vocals
Barry Gibb – rhythm guitar, backing vocals
Maurice Gibb – bass guitar, piano, harpsichord, backing vocals
Colin Petersen – drums
Bill Shepherd – orchestral arrangement

Cover versions
Nina Simone recorded and released this song in the UK as the B-side of "To Love Somebody", another cover by Simone lifted from the Bee Gees' 1st album. The two songs were included on her 1969 album To Love Somebody.
Le Orme covered this song and recorded and released in the same year "Mita Mita" in Italy.

The Marbles version

The Marbles covered the song, their version being released in August 1969 as their third single in the United States. The Marbles covered the song in August that year, it was also released as a single in Germany and France. The Marbles had recently worked with the Gibb brothers between 1968 and 1969, but the brothers were not involved on the Marbles version. The arrangement was by Jimmy Horowitz. Its flipside was "Little Boy" was also written by the Gibb brothers.

The song was included in 1970 on their only self-titled album. Their version was later used as the B-side of the duo's last single "Breaking Up Is Hard to Do".

References

1967 singles
Bee Gees songs
Songs written by Barry Gibb
Songs written by Robin Gibb
Song recordings produced by Robert Stigwood
Polydor Records singles
Atco Records singles
1969 singles
Nina Simone songs
The Marbles (duo) songs
1967 songs